The Bayer designation κ Ceti (Kappa Ceti) is shared by two stars in the constellation of Cetus:

 : a yellow dwarf star approximately 29 light-years away.
 : a yellow giant star ten times as distant.

Ceti, Kappa
Cetus (constellation)